Svarstad is a Norwegian surname. Notable people with the surname include:

 Anders Castus Svarstad (1869–1943), Norwegian painter
 Hans Svarstad (1883–1971), Norwegian politician
 Paul Svarstad (1917–1998), Norwegian politician

Norwegian-language surnames